Babolsar County is in Mazandaran province, Iran, on the Caspian Sea. The capital of the county is the city of Babolsar. At the 2006 census, the county's population was 172,600 in 46,595 households. The following census in 2011 counted 124,323 people in 37,838 households, by which time Fereydunkenar District had been separated from the county to form Fereydunkenar County. At the 2016 census, the county's population was 135,191 in 44,482 households.

Administrative divisions

The population history and structural changes of Babolsar County's administrative divisions over three consecutive censuses are shown in the following table. The latest census shows three districts, six rural districts, and three cities.

References

 

Counties of Mazandaran Province